Stenkovec Brazda Airfield is a recreational airfield 9 km (5 mi) northwest of Skopje in North Macedonia. There are many activities at this field: airplanes, helicopters, gliders and motor-gliders, ultralight airplanes, remote control models, skydivers. etc. Its approval is for VFR only. At the moment  there are two Ultralight flight schools: Pipistrel Flying Club - PFC Skopje and Wing Air Team. One School for PPL(A), GPL & Parachute licence - Air Club "SKOPJE" - Skopje.

Incidents and accidents
On 21 September 2013, a private Cessna 172SP Skyhawk crashed at Stenkovec Airport after the pilot lost control over the airplane due to low airspeed, stall flight at extreme low altitude. The pilot wasn't high enough to gain control over the aircraft to avoid the impact on the ground. The aircraft was written off.

References

Airports in North Macedonia